Česká soda was a satirical TV show created by Febio for Česká televize. The show was aired between the years 1993 and 1997. Total number of 14 episodes was created plus two New Year's Eve specials and a 1998 full-length picture. Running time of one episode was approximately 15 minutes.

Overview
The show consisted of a news summary presented by Petr Čtvrtníček, parodies of TV advertisements and since the second episode of a German language course "Alles Gute" created by David Vávra and Milan Šteindler.

The authors of Česká soda were merciless to the victims of their sketches and their humor was on the border of good taste. In spite of this, the show had high ratings and according to a 2006 inquiry it is still Febio's most popular show.

After a dispute about a trade mark "Česká soda" with a company producing a drink of the same name, the show was renamed to "Čtvrtníček, Šteindler a Vávra uvádějí" and with similar names occasionally appeared on TV until the year 2000.

References

External links
 

Czech comedy television series
1993 Czech television series debuts
1997 Czech television series endings
Czech Television original programming